The general secretary of the Workers' Party of Korea (Korean:  조선로동당 총비서) is the head of the Workers' Party of Korea, the ruling party in North Korea, and considered as the supreme leader of North Korea. The general secretary is the chairman of the Central Military Commission of the Workers' Party of Korea, as well as a member of the Politburo Presidium, the Politburo and the Secretariat.

The Rules of the Workers' Party of Korea stipulates that the general secretary represents, organizes and leads the party. Aside from holding positions within the party, the general secretary is also the president of the State Affairs – the head of state of North Korea – and the supreme commander of the North Korean armed forces. The general secretary may authorize any Politburo Presidium member to preside Politburo meetings, as well as be represented by a first secretary who is elected by the Central Committee.

The general secretary is elected by the Party Congress for a term of five years. However, a Party Conference may be convened in between party congresses which also has the power to elect the general secretary.

The post has existed under various titles since the party's earliest ancestor was founded in 1945. It has been titled as secretary (1945-1946), chairman (1946-1966 and 2016-2021), general secretary (1966-2012 and 2021-present), and first secretary (2012-2016).

Kim Jong-un has led the party since 11 April 2012. He is a son of Kim Jong-il, who led the WPK from 1997 to 2011, and a grandson of Kim Il-sung, the party's leader from 1949 to 1994.

History
On 13 October 1945, the Communist Party of Korea established its North Korean Branch Bureau at the Conference of Members and Enthusiasts in the Five Northwestern Provinces, with Kim Yong-bom being elected as secretary of the North Korean Branch Bureau of the Communist Party of Korea (Korean: 조선공산당 북조선분국 비서). Kim Il-sung replaced Kim Yong-bom as secretary on 18 December of the same year. The North Korean Branch Bureau broke away from the Communist Party of Korea during the 5th enlarged plenary meeting of the Executive Committee on 10 April 1946 and became the Communist Party of North Korea. Kim Il-sung remained to lead the party as chairman of the Central Committee of the Communist Party of North Korea (Korean: 북조선공산당 중앙위원회 위원장).

At the 1st Party Congress on 30 August 1946, the Communist Party of North Korea merged with the New People's Party of Korea to form the Workers' Party of North Korea. Kim Tu-bong, the leader of the New People's Party of Korea, was elected by the 1st Central Committee as chairman of the Central Committee of the Workers' Party of North Korea (Korean: 북조선로동당 중앙위원회 위원장), with Kim Il-sung being elected as vice chairman.

The Workers' Party of North Korea and the Workers' Party of South Korea merged to form the Workers' Party of Korea during the 1st joint plenary meeting of the 2nd Central Committee on 24 June 1949, with Kim Il-sung being elected as chairman of the Central Committee of the Workers' Party of Korea (Korean: 조선로동당 중앙위원회 위원장).

Kim Il-sung was elected as general secretary of the Central Committee of the Workers' Party of Korea (Korean: 조선로동당 중앙위원회 총비서) in the 14th plenary meeting of the 4th Central Committee on 12 October 1966. He was re-elected in 1970 by the 5th Central Committee and in 1980 by the 6th Central Committee and remained in office until his death on 8 July 1994. The position of general secretary of the Central Committee was left vacant for three years following Kim Il-sung's death.

Provincial party conferences were held in September 1997 which recommended for Kim Il-sung's son, Kim Jong-il, to become general secretary. Kim Jong-il was named as general secretary of the Workers' Party of Korea on 8 October 1997 through a joint announcement of the 6th Central Committee and the 6th Central Military Commission. Kim Jong-il was re-elected as general secretary in 2010 at the 3rd Party Conference and remained in office until his death on 17 December 2011.

On 11 April 2012, Kim Jong-un, one of Kim Jong-il's sons, was elected first secretary of the Workers' Party of Korea (Korean: 조선로동당 제1비서) at the 4th Party Conference while Kim Jong-il was named as eternal general secretary (Korean: 영원한 총비서). Kim Jong-un was elected as chairman of the Workers' Party of Korea (Korean: 조선로동당 위원장) on 9 May 2016 at the 7th Party Congress.

On 10 January 2021, Kim Jong-un was elected as general secretary at the 8th Party Congress.

List of office holders

See also
 Politburo of the Workers' Party of Korea
 Presidium of the Politburo of the Workers' Party of Korea
 Secretariat of the Workers' Party of Korea

Notes

References

Footnotes

Bibliography

Books:
 
 
  
Journal articles:
 

1945 establishments in Korea
Government of North Korea
Leaders of political parties in North Korea